Cookie cake pie is a dessert that consists of a layer of cookie dough topped by a layer of cake batter baked in a single-shell pie crust and frosted. It has been described as "the turducken of desserts".

Origin
First described on the website www.cakespy.com, this dessert is included in Jessie Oleson's cookbook Sweet Treats for a Sugar Filled Life. This concoction is also offered commercially.

See also

 List of pies, tarts and flans
 Cookie cake
 Cherpumple

References

External links
Flickr 3 April 2008
Ensemble Magazine (in Dutch)
Cakespy presents Sweet Treats for a Sugar Filled Life

Desserts
Cakes
Cookies
Pies